Teleorhinus is a genus of plant bugs in the family Miridae. There are about eight described species in Teleorhinus.

Species
These eight species belong to the genus Teleorhinus:
 Teleorhinus brindleyi Knight, 1968 i
 Teleorhinus crataegi Wyniger, 2010 c g
 Teleorhinus cyaneus Uhler, 1890 i c g b
 Teleorhinus floridanus Blatchley, 1926 i g
 Teleorhinus nigricornis Knight, 1968 i
 Teleorhinus oregoni Knight, 1968 i
 Teleorhinus tephrosicola Knight, 1923 i c g b
 Teleorhinus utahensis Knight, 1968 i
Data sources: i = ITIS, c = Catalogue of Life, g = GBIF, b = Bugguide.net

References

Further reading

 
 
 
 
 
 
 
 
 

Phylinae